Wicked Attraction (broadcast in some countries as Couples Who Kill) is an American true-crime documentary television series on Investigation Discovery which began airing in the United States in 2008. The series focuses on how two seemingly ordinary people can come together to commit heinous crimes, thereby forming a "wicked attraction."

Synopsis
Wicked Attraction uses some of the world's leading criminal psychologists to explore couples who kill by delving into the minds of some of the most infamous criminals in history. It seeks to explain how murdering duos find each other, how they select their victims, and what motivates them. Each hour of Wicked Attraction features one case, and takes the audience through the twists and turns of the killers' deadly relationship and law enforcement's investigation and arrest of each murdering couple.

Episode guide

Season 1 (2008)
 "The Perfect Couple" (1x01). The murders of Leslie Mahaffy and Kristen French in Toronto, committed by Paul Bernardo and Karla Homolka are profiled. 
 "Minivan Murders" (1x02). James Anthony Daveggio and Michelle Lyn Michaud were sentenced to death for the 1997 abduction, rape, torture, and murder of 22-year-old Vanessa Lei Samson from Pleasanton, California and abducted several other women in their minivan between September and December 1997. 
 "Madness of Two" (1x03). Elizabeth Haysom, 20, solicits her 18-year-old boyfriend Jens Söring to commit the double murder of her parents.
 "Evil in the Desert" (1x04). The "Toy Box Murders", perpetrated by David Parker Ray and Cindy Hendy in Truth or Consequences, New Mexico are detailed.
 "Blood Brothers" (1x05). Charles Ng and Leonard Lake are responsible for a series of rapes, tortures, and murders in Calaveras County, California.
 "Twisted Twosome" (1x06). Gerald and Charlene Gallego abduct teenagers in Sacramento, California, use them as sex slaves, and then murder them.
 "Mother Knows Best" (1x07). Sante Kimes and her son Kenny are a pair of con artists who are linked to two murders, robbery, and insurance fraud.
 "Kidnapped" (1x08). The kidnapping of Colleen Stan, who was kept as a sex slave for seven years by Cameron and Janice Hooker (aka Janice Lashley, MSW), is profiled.
 "Our Little Secret" (1x09). Nursing home workers Gwendolyn Graham and Cathy Wood asphyxiated five elderly women in Grand Rapids, Michigan.
 "Hearts of Darkness" (1x10). Alvin and Judith Neelley are responsible for the torture-murders of Lisa Ann Millican and Janice Chatman.
 "Murder at Twilight" (1x11). A deadly cattle scheme ends in murder, and Ray and Faye Copeland are responsible.
 "Driven by Desire" (1x12). Eight people are raped and murdered in Illinois, Indiana, and Ohio by Alton Coleman and his accomplice Debra Brown.
 "Death on the Sunset Strip" (1x13). Douglas Clark and Carol M. Bundy are responsible for killing several young prostitutes and runaways in Los Angeles, California.

Season 2 (2009)
 "The Two Bears" (2x01). Michael Bear Carson and Suzan Carson commit three murders in the San Francisco Bay Area.
 "Golden Years" (2x02). The Black Widow Murders, committed by Helen Golay and Olga Rutterschmidt for life insurance money, are detailed.
 "The Folsom Wolf" (2x03). James Gregory Marlow and Cynthia Coffman rape, torture, and murder four young women across the country.
 "A Mother's Love" (2x04). Theresa Knorr savagely murders her daughters, while using her other children to facilitate the crimes.
 "Payback" (2x05). David Anderson and Alex Baranyi are responsible for the Wilson family murders known as the Bellevue Massacre.
 "The Toolbox Killers" (2x06). Lawrence Bittaker and Roy Norris kidnap, torture, rape, and murder five teenage girls in California.
 "Opportunity Knocks" (2x07). Young lovers Alicia Woodward and John Esposito go on a cross-country spree committing robberies and murders.
 "My Girl" (2x08). Michelle Hetzel and her husband Brandon Bloss are responsible for the stabbing of Devon Guzman, Michelle's lesbian lover.
 "Consumed by Envy" (2x09). Jacqueline Williams and Fedell Caffey want a baby, and resort to murdering an entire family to get one.
 "No Remorse" (2x10). Sarah Edmondson shoots a woman in a convenience store robbery, and Ben Darras kills a man in his Mississippi home.
 "Single White Male" (2x11). Patrick Selepak and Samantha Bachynski commit the murders of Scott Berels, his wife, and her unborn child.
 "Picture Perfect" (2x12). Diane Zamora is an Annapolis naval cadet who plots the murder of Adrianne Jones with her boyfriend David Graham.
 "Dead or Alive" (2x13). Joshua Maxwell and Tessie McFarland go on a cross-country crime spree after murdering an Indiana mechanic.

Season 3 (2010)
 "Built for Murder" (3x01). Fitness pros Craig Titus and Kelly Ryan are responsible for the murder of their personal assistant Melissa James.
 "Home Sweet Home" (3x02). Michelle and David Knotek lure guests to their boardinghouse in South Bend, Washington, and then murder them.
 "Evil in the Blood" (3x03). Ricky Gray and Ray Dandridge murder seven people over a seven-day period during the 2006 Richmond spree murders.
 "Superstar" (3x04). Jeremy Brooks, a former boxer, and his girlfriend Coty Martinez commit three murders in Louisiana, Minnesota, and North Dakota.
 "Beyond the Wire" (3x05). Carolyn King and Bradley Martin kill a Pennsylvania florist, and then kidnap and later murder a North Dakota woman.
 "Innocence Lost" (3x06). Michael Thornton and his protégée Janeen Snyder are linked to the disappearances and murders of Michelle Curran and Jessie Peters.
 "Calm Before the Storm" (3x07). Skylar Deleon and his wife Jennifer Henderson are the perpetrators of the murder of Thomas and Jackie Hawks on their yacht.
 "Shoot to Thrill" (3x08). The Serial Shooters, Dale Hausner and Sam Dieteman, who attacked the streets of Phoenix, Arizona for fifteen months, are profiled.
 "Dial 123" (3x09). Kelly Gissendaner and her lover Gregory Owen plot the stabbing death of Kelly's husband Doug.
 "Live Free or Die" (3x10). Jeanne Dominico is murdered after refusing to allow her teenage daughter Nicole Kasinskas to move in with her boyfriend Billy Sullivan.
 "Deadly Disciple" (3x11). The Children of Thunder, Justin and Glenn Helzer, are responsible for the murders of five people in Northern California.
 "Crossing the Line" (3x12). Darnell Smith and his girlfriend Tina Leja murder Bobbie Dee Holder and bury his body in Chippewa, Wisconsin.
 "A Lover's Betrayal" (3x13). The murder of Sherri Dally in a grocery store parking lot, perpetrated by Michael Dally and Diana Haun, is detailed.

Season 4 (2011)
 "Till Death Do Us Part" (4x01). The ordeal Deborah Brown endured at the hands of her ex-husband Steven Brown and his girlfriend Patricia Teeter is detailed.
 "57 Seconds" (4x02). Konstantinos Fotopoulos and Deidre Hunt are responsible for the murders of Kevin Ramsey and Bryan Chase and the attempted murder of Lisa Fotopoulos.
 "Dante's Inferno" (4x03). Twins Dante and Donte Hall are the perpetrators in the robbery-murders of Keson Evans and Anthony Blunt in Eustis, Florida.
 "Bad Fortune" (4x04). Tanya Jaime Nelson and Philippe Zamora kill fortuneteller Ha Smith and her daughter during a home invasion robbery in Orange County, California.
 "No Place to Hide" (4x05). The uncle-nephew team of Maurice Mason and Bennie Frier are responsible for the murders of two people in Wisconsin.
 "See No Evil" (4x06). A home invasion turns deadly when Danielle Simpson and his wife Jennifer commit the drowning murder of Geraldine Davidson.
 "Good Deeds Punished" (4x07). An elderly Jacksonville, Florida, couple are tortured and murdered by their neighbor Tiffany Cole and her boyfriend Michael Jackson.
 "Golden Buddha" (4x08). When nine people are massacred in a Buddhist temple in Waddell, Arizona, Jonathan Doody and Alex Garcia are charged with the crime.
 "Deadly Rival" (4x09). Jenna Nannetti, 17, is murdered, and her estranged husband Michael Simons and his girlfriend Katie Belflower are the perpetrators.
 "Sex, Lies, and Bloody Goodbyes" (4x10). Catherina Voss and her lover Michael Draven plan the murder of her navy sailor husband at an ATM in Newport News, Virginia.
 "The Jaycee Dugard Story" (4x11). The horrible 18-year-long ordeal suffered by Jaycee Lee Dugard at the hands of Phillip and Nancy Garrido is profiled.
 "Lesbians and the Little Man" (4x12). Tracy Lee Poirier and Tamara Marie Upton commit the robbery-murder Donald Fish in Oregon, then escape from prison.
 "Rough Diamonds" (4x13). The drug habits of Christopher Dimeo and Nicole Pearce lead to a cross-country crime spree from California to Connecticut.

Season 5 (2012)
 "No Sharing Allowed" (5x01). Bobbi Jo Smith and Jennifer Jones plan the murder of an amateur pornographer, then go on a Thelma-and-Louise style getaway.
 "Lust for Life" (5x02). After Lisa Toney, a seemingly loving wife, and Sienky Lallemand, a seasoned con man, begin an affair, the couple hatch an explosive murder plot.
 "A Slice of Murder" (5x03). Mitchell Sims was a disgruntled Domino's employee, and he and his girlfriend Ruby Padgett get revenge by murdering his former co-workers.
 "Fascination with Death" (5x04). Jonathan Lawrence and Jeremiah Rodgers' fascination with death culminates in the gruesome murder of 18-year-old Jennifer Robinson.
 "House Guests from Hell" (5x05). Crystal Soto and Charles Jordan murder elderly Bowie, Texas couple James and Ullain Christmas, then escape from prison with Curtis Gambill and Joshua Bagwell.
 "Death Ride" (5x06). Jacksonville, North Carolina, men Jamey Cheek and Tom Nelson kill a taxi driver, rob a local restaurant, then engage authorities in a deadly gunfight.
 "The Power of Love" (5x07). Melissa Bredow and Jason Belanger were a young married couple in Alpena, Michigan who plotted the death of 69-year-old James Orban. Melissa, who denied having been Orban's lover, erroneously believed she was set to inherit $2 million via Orban's will.
 "The Body Shifters" (5x08). Lafayette, Colorado couple Bryan Grove and Tess Damm resorted to murdering Tess' mother in order to continue their forbidden relationship.
 "Rebels with a Deadly Cause" (5x09). John Lewis, Vincent Hubbard, Robin Machuca, and Eileen Huber are responsible for a series of robberies and murders in the San Gabriel Valley.
 "Weapon of Mass Seduction" (5x10). Evidence found in a pickup truck ties Robert Trease and Hope Robin Siegel to the murder of Lido Key resident Paul Edenson. The show's producers changed Siegel's name to Karen Richards.
 "Dressed to Kill" (5x11). When Leslie Ballard is left out of her millionaire father's will, she and her new husband Mike MacKool kill her mother to collect her inheritance.
 "Love Me Tenderizer" (5x12). Mike Murdaugh and his girlfriend Becky Rohrs are responsible for luring in Becky's admirers, then robbing, killing, and disposing of them.
 "A Rose Amongst Thorns" (5x13). Steven and Sylvia Beersdorf decide to murder their son's 21-year-old fiancée Rose Goggins so they can receive custody of their 11-month-old grandson. The show's producers changed the son's name from Steven Jr to Robert.
 "Wheels of Steel" (5x14) The case detailed is that of Michael Perry and Jason Burkett, who plotted to steal a car and ended up killing Sandra Stotler, her son Adam, and his friend Jeremy.

Season 6 (2013)
 "Venus Guy Trap" (6x01). Terry Sellers and Taiana Matheny are involved in a murder-robbery scheme that resulted in the deaths of two people in Omaha, Nebraska.
 "More Than a Babysitter" (6x02). Larry Tooley and Tina Young were heroin addicts who were responsible for a teenager's murder in Franklin Township, Pennsylvania.
 "Mommy's Little Helpers" (6x03). Laura Hernandez is accused of manipulating her children into helping her get what she wanted - a dead husband, and a life insurance payout.
 "Straight Through the Heartland" (6x04). Wayne Lewis and Ella Mae Dicks are responsible for the 1978 murder of Sherry Lee Gibson, and get away with it for more than 25 years. The show's producers changed Dicks' name to Wendy Lewis.
 "A Recipe for Disaster" (6x05). The crimes of Lisa Jo Chamberlin and Roger Gillett, who killed two people and dumped their bodies in a freezer, are detailed.
 "Freedom Quest" (6x06). Melanie Ray and Chandler Clark shoot and kill Andre Dupuis on the side of a road in Chester County, Pennsylvania.
 "The Dark Krystal" (6x07). Krystal Hall and Patrick Connelly are a meth-addicted couple who killed Krystal's father in Hortense, Georgia during a drug-fueled attack.
 "A Mother's Worst Nightmare" (6x08). Alesia Warrior and Darrell Rodgers' murder plot goes awry when Alesia is paralyzed by the same gunfire that killed her husband.
 "Dirty Double Cross" (6x09). Casey and Meredith Jonell Ledbetter get wrapped up in a series of scams and end up charged with the murders of two people. The show's producers changed Meredith's name to Jo.
 "No Easy Road" (6x10). C.J. Harvey, his wife, and three sons are responsible for the torture and murder of Bo McNeely in their Laddonia, Missouri home.
 "The Cougar and Her Cub" (6x11). The murder of Ricky Acevedo in Brooksville, Florida, perpetrated by Sherrie Dicus and Steven Wesolek, are profiled.
 "True Bromance" (6x12). Nathan Lee and Troy Smiley were two young people from Etowah County, Alabama who killed teenager Jeffrey Stone and stored his body in a freezer.
 "Prey for Me" (6x13). Angela Dawn Fowler and Robert Heydman were lovers who plotted the beating death of Richard Craig Fowler in his Spartanburg, South Carolina home.

References

External links
 http://www.tv-links.eu/tv-shows/Wicked-Attraction_26207/
 http://www.tvguide.com/tvshows/wicked-attraction/episodes/295138

2000s American crime television series
2008 American television series debuts
2013 American television series endings
Investigation Discovery original programming
True crime television series